This uniform polyhedron compound is a symmetric arrangement of 6 decagonal prisms, aligned with the axes of fivefold rotational symmetry of a dodecahedron.

Cartesian coordinates 
Cartesian coordinates for the vertices of this compound are all the cyclic permutations of

 (±√(τ−1/√5), ±2τ, ±√(τ/√5))
 (±(√(τ−1/√5)−τ2), ±1, ±(√(τ/√5)+τ))
 (±(√(τ−1/√5)−τ), ±τ2, ±(√(τ/√5)+1))
 (±(√(τ−1/√5)+τ), ±τ2, ±(√(τ/√5)−1))
 (±(√(τ−1/√5)+τ2), ±1, ±(√(τ/√5)−τ))

where τ = (1+√5)/2 is the golden ratio (sometimes written φ).

References 
.

Polyhedral compounds